Amjad Khan (born 25 February 1989) is a cricketer who played for the United Arab Emirates national cricket team. He made his Twenty20 International (T20I) debut for the United Arab Emirates against Oman on 22 November 2015. In November 2021, he was selected to play for the Kandy Warriors following the players' draft for the 2021 Lanka Premier League.

References

External links
 

1989 births
Living people
Emirati cricketers
United Arab Emirates Twenty20 International cricketers
Sportspeople from Dubai
Pakistani expatriate sportspeople in the United Arab Emirates